Eon Joseph Densworth (born 28 January 1938) is a former Australian rules footballer who played with Footscray in the Victorian Football League (VFL).

Notes

External links 
		

Living people
1938 births
Australian rules footballers from Victoria (Australia)
Western Bulldogs players
Eastlake Football Club players